Xinzhou, ancient name Xiurong (秀荣), is a prefecture-level city occupying the north-central section of Shanxi Province in the People's Republic of China, bordering Hebei to the east, Shaanxi to the west, and Inner Mongolia to the northwest.

Administrative divisions

Climate
Xinzhou has a continental, monsoon-influenced semi-arid climate (Köppen BSk), with cold, very dry, and somewhat long winters, and warm, somewhat humid summers. Typifying the influence of the East Asian Monsoon, close to three-fourths of the annual  of precipitation occurs from June to September.

Demographics 
According to the seventh national census of Xinzhou, the prefecture city had 2,689,700 inhabitants in 2020, of whom the built-up (or metro) area was home to 1,446,400 inhabitants. Contrasting to the previous census conducted in 2000, there is a decline of 378,000 inhabitants (-12.32%, or -1.31% annually). Xinzhou is the eighth populous city in Shanxi. The illiteracy rate of Xinzhou is 2.39% ,decrease 1.13% from 2010. Xinzhou’s sex ratio is 106:100 (Woman is 100).

Tourism
Dai County is home to the AAAAA-rated Yanmen Pass, a mountain pass hosting a major fortification along the Great Wall. And Mount Wutai is one of four sacred mountain of  Buddhist (中国佛教四圣山).

Education
Xinzhou has numerous public high schools. And Xin Zhou Di Yi Zhong Xue (Xin Zhou Number One High School), is considered the most prestigious public high school in this region.

Another public high school of interest is the nearby laboratory high school. It functions as an extension of the Xin Zhou Normal University. The third famous high school is the Xin Zhou Shi Yan Zhong Xue (Xin Zhou Experimental High School). This school was initiated as a public-private partnership. The school is partially funded by the Chinese government, follows national educational standards, and maintains close ties (and even joint faculty) with Xin Zhou Yi Zhong Xue; however, it maintains a greater independence from the government than traditional public schools. The experimental school also runs a small primary school program (generally only one classroom per grade level) which is populated almost exclusively by the children of Yi Zhong Xue and Shi Yan Zhong Xue teachers.

Transportation
China National Highway 108
China National Highway 208
G1812 Cangyu Expressway
G55 Erenhot–Guangzhou Expressway
Xinzhou Wutaishan Airport

References

External links

 Official website of Xinzhou People's Government

 
Cities in Shanxi